Nausinoe capensis is a moth in the family Crambidae. It was described by Francis Walker in 1866. It is found on the Comoros and Seychelles and in Kenya and South Africa.

References

Moths described in 1866
Spilomelinae